The year 2021 is the 9th year in the history of the Absolute Championship Akhmat, a mixed martial arts promotion based in Russia.

List of events

ACA YE 16: Grand Prix

Absolute Championship Akhmat Young Eagles 16: Grand Prix was a mixed martial arts event held by Absolute Championship Akhmat on January 30, 2021 at the Tolstoy-Yurt Arena in Tolstoy-Yurt, Russia.

Background

Bonus awards:
 
The following fighters were awarded bonuses:
Fight of the Night: Chermen Gobaev vs. Anzor Elgaraev
Knockout of the Night: Umalat Israpilov
Submission of the Night: Islam Konchiev

Results

ACA 117: Bagov vs. Silvério

Absolute Championship Akhmat 117: Bagov vs. Silvério was a mixed martial arts event held by Absolute Championship Akhmat on February 12, 2021, in at the WOW Arena in Krasnaya Polyana, Russia.

Background
Former ACA Lightweight champion Ali Bagov will have his third welterweight fight against Elias Silvério.

A welterweight bout between the former ACA Lightweight title challenger Khusein Khaliev and the former M-1 Global Lightweight Champion Alexander Butenko will serve as event co-headliner. They were supposed to fight at ACA 116 in December 2020 but Butenko had withdrawn due to an injury.

Bonus awards:
 
The following fighters were awarded $10,000 bonuses:
Fight of the Night: Ramazan Kishev vs. Askhab Zulaev
Knockout of the Night: Dzhihad Yunusov
Submission of the Night: Rene Pessoa
$5000 Stoppage Victory Bonuses: Zamir Aripshev, Batraz Agnaev, Ayndi Umakhanov, Imran Bukuev, Daud Shaikhaev, Alikhan Vakhaev

Results

ACA YE 17: Grand Prix

Absolute Championship Akhmat Young Eagles 17: Grand Prix was a mixed martial arts event held by Absolute Championship Akhmat on February 20, 2021, at the Tolstoy-Yurt Arena in Tolstoy-Yurt, Russia.

Background

Bonus awards:
 
The following fighters were awarded bonuses:
Submission of the Night: Ramazan Yuzyasharov

Results

ACA 118: Abdulaev vs. Vagaev 2

Absolute Championship Akhmat 118: Abdulaev vs. Vagaev 2 was a mixed martial arts event held by Absolute Championship Akhmat on February 26, 2021, at the Basket Hall Moscow in Moscow, Russia.

Background
The event was headlined by a title fight for the ACA welterweight title between 2 formers WFCA welterweight champion and current ACA champ Murad Abdulaev and Abubakar Vagaev. Abdulaev have previously beaten Vagaev by knockout at WFCA 53 to win the WFCA welterweight Title.

A rematch between former FNG Welterweight Champion Georgy Kichigin and Gadzhimurad Khiramagomedov served as the co-main event of the evening. The pairing previously met at Fight Nights Global 65, where Kichigin defeated Khiramagomedov by split decision to capture the FNG inaugural title.

Rasul Mirzaev was scheduled to fight Nurbergen Sharipov in a featherweight bout, but the fight was canceled when Sharipov missed weight by 4.5 Kilograms.

Bonus awards:
 
The following fighters were awarded $10,000 bonuses:
Fight of the Night: Abdul-Rakhman Dudaev vs. Pavel Vitruk
Knockout of the Night: Azamat Pshukov
Submission of the Night: Alexander Sarnavskiy
$5000 Stoppage Victory Bonuses: Bekhruz Zukhurov

Results

ACA 119: Frolov vs. da Silva

Absolute Championship Akhmat 119: Frolov vs. da Silva was a mixed martial arts event held by Absolute Championship Akhmat on March 12, 2021, at the Basket-Hall in Krasnodar, Russia.

Background
The event was headlined by a middleweight bout between the former M-1 Global Middleweight Champion Artem Frolov and Wendres da Silva.

The card also featured a welterweight bout between Eldar Khashpakov and #10 ranked Mark Hulme.

Bonus awards:
 
The following fighters were awarded $10,000 bonuses:
Fight of the Night: Eldar Khashpakov vs. Mark Hulme 
Knockout of the Night: Artem Frolov
Submission of the Night: Walter Pereira Jr.
$5000 Stoppage Victory Bonuses: Adlan Ibragimov, Makhochi Sagitov

Results

ACA 120: Oliveira vs. Bibulatov

Absolute Championship Akhmat 120: Oliveira vs. Bibulatov was a mixed martial arts event held by Absolute Championship Akhmat on March 26, 2021, at the Sibur Arena in Saint Petersburg, Russia.

Background
The event featured a title fight, the reigning ACA Bantamweight champion Daniel Oliveira fought Magomed Bibulatov in the headliner.

A title bout between former champion Felipe Froes and Magomedrasul Khasbulaev served as the ACA 120 co-main event, the bout was for the vacant ACA Featherweight title. The pairing were supposed to have met previously on November 6, 2020, at ACA 113, but Khasbulaev was unable to compete due to a leg injury. Froes missed weight and therefore was not eligible to win the title if he wins the fight.

Bonus awards:
 
The following fighters were awarded $10,000 bonuses:
Fight of the Night: Apti Bimarzaev vs. Tural Ragimov
Fight of the Night: Islam Omarov vs. Bibert Tumenov
Submission of the Night: Amirkhan Guliev
$5000 Stoppage Victory Bonuses: Salimgerey Rasulov, Magomedrasul Khasbulaev

Results

ACA 121: Dipchikov vs. Gasanov

Absolute Championship Akhmat 121: Dipchikov vs. Gasanov was a mixed martial arts event held by Absolute Championship Akhmat on April 9, 2021, at the Falcon Arena in Minsk, Belarus.

Background
ACA 121 was the first of two consecutive events held in Minsk, Belarus. In the main event, the undefeated ACA Flyweight champion Azamat Kerefov made his second title defense against the #3 ranked Rasul Albaskhanov. However, 2 days before Kerefov had to withdraw from the bout due to health issues.

Nikola Dipchikov will fight Magomedrasul Gasanov for the interim ACA Middleweight title.

Bonus awards:
 
The following fighters were awarded $10,000 bonuses:
Fight of the Night: Oleg Borisov vs. Shamil Shakhbulatov
Submission of the Night: Alikhan Suleimanov

Results

ACA YE 18: Grand Prix 1/4 Finals 

Absolute Championship Akhmat Young Eagles 18: Grand Prix 1/4 Finalswas a mixed martial arts event held by Absolute Championship Akhmat on April 12, 2021, at the Tolstoy-Yurt Arena in Tolstoy-Yurt, Russia.

Background

Bonus awards:
 
The following fighters were awarded bonuses:
Fight of the Night: Basir Saraliev vs. Adilet Nurmatov
Knockout of the Night: Alimkhan Djamulaev
Submission of the Night: Ibrakhim Askhabov

Results

ACA 122: Johnson vs. Poberezhets

Absolute Championship Akhmat 122: Johnson vs. Poberezhets was a mixed martial arts event held by Absolute Championship Akhmat on April 23, 2021, at the Falcon Arena in Minsk, Belarus.

Background
Tony Johnson's defense of his heavyweight title against the #2 ranked Dmitry Poberezhets served as the event headliner.

Bonus awards:
 
The following fighters were awarded $10,000 bonuses:
Knockout of the Night: Artem Damkovsky
Submission of the Night: Aurel Pîrtea

Results

ACA 123: Koshkin vs. Butenko

Absolute Championship Akhmat 123: Koshkin vs. Butenko was a mixed martial arts event held by Absolute Championship Akhmat on May 28, 2021, at the CSKA Arena in Moscow, Russia.

Background
A welterweight bout between Alexander Butenko and Andrey Koshkin was expected to serve as the event headliner.

A welterweight fight contested by Elias Silvério and Georgiy Kichigin served as co-main event.

Bonus awards:

The following fighters were awarded bonuses:
$50,000 Performance of the Night: Rene Pessoa
$5000 Stoppage Victory Bonuses: Josiel Silva, Leonardo Limberger, Aren Akopyan, Artur Astakhov, Andrey Koshkin

Results

ACA 124: Galiev vs. Batista

Absolute Championship Akhmat 124: Galiev vs. Batista was a mixed martial arts event held by Absolute Championship Akhmat on June 11, 2021, at the TatNeft Arena in Kazan, Russia.

Background
Bonus awards:

The following fighters were awarded bonuses:
$50,000 Performance of the Night: Altynbek Mamashov
$5000 Stoppage Victory Bonuses: Osimkhon Rakhmonov, Herdeson Batista

Results

ACA 125: Dudaev vs. de Lima

Absolute Championship Akhmat 125: Dudaev vs. de Lima was a mixed martial arts event held by Absolute Championship Akhmat on June 29, 2021, at the Bolshoy Ice Dome in Sochi, Russia.

Background
Maycon Silvan was scheduled to fight against Imran Bukuev. However, Silvan pulled out of the fight on the day before the event due to health problems, the fight was canceled.

Bayzet Khatkhokhu was scheduled to fight against Musa Khamanaev in a lightweight bout. But, Khatkhokhu badly missed weight 1.95 kg over the limit on Monday, leading to the cancellation of his fight with Khamanaev on Tuesday night at Bolshoy Ice Dome.

Bonus awards:

The following fighters were awarded bonuses:
$50,000 Performance of the Night: Azamat Amagov
$5000 Stoppage Victory Bonuses: Ali Bagov, Abdul-Rakhman Dudaev

Results

ACA 126: Magomedov vs. Egemberdiev

Absolute Championship Akhmat 126: Magomedov vs. Egemberdiev was a mixed martial arts event held by Absolute Championship Akhmat on July 16, 2021, at the Bolshoy Ice Dome in Sochi, Russia.

Background
The event was headlined by a vacant ACA Light Heavyweight title fight between Muslim Magomedov and Evgeniy Egemberdiev.

The co-main event featured a lightweight bout between Marat Balaev and Joao Luiz Nogueira.

Bonus awards:

The following fighters were awarded bonuses:
$50,000 Performance of the Night: Husein Kushagov
$5000 Stoppage Victory Bonuses: Mehdi Baidulaev, Cleverson Silva, Dzhihad Yunusov, Muslim Magomedov

Results

ACA YE 19: Saidulaev vs. Nurzhanov

Absolute Championship Akhmat Young Eagles 19: Saidulaev vs. Nurzhanov was a mixed martial arts event held by Absolute Championship Akhmat on July 24, 2021, at the Tolstoy-Yurt Arena in Tolstoy-Yurt, Russia.

Background

Bonus awards:
 
The following fighters were awarded bonuses: 
Knockout of the Night: Bay-Ali Shaipov
Submission of the Night: Saykhan Djabrailov

Results

ACA YE 20: Grand Prix Semi-Finals 

Absolute Championship Akhmat Young Eagles 20: Grand Prix Semi-Finalswas a mixed martial arts event held by Absolute Championship Akhmat on August 16, 2021, at the Sport Hall Coliseum in Grozny, Russia.

Background

Bonus awards:
 
The following fighters were awarded bonuses:
Knockout of the Night: Baysangur Susurkaev
Submission of the Night: Eldar Munapov

Results

ACA 127: Kerefov vs. Albaskhanov

Absolute Championship Akhmat 127: Kerefov vs. Albaskhanov will be a mixed martial arts event held by Absolute Championship Akhmat on August 28, 2021, at the Basket-Hall in Krasnodar, Russia.

Background
The main event featured Azamat Kerefov who made his second ACA Flyweight title defense against the #3 ranked Rasul Albaskhanov.

A Featherweight title bout between the champion Magomedrasul Khasbulaev and the challenger Ramazan Kishev was previously scheduled for ACA 127. However, on August 4, Khasbulaev was removed from the card because of an injury, the title bout was moved to ACA 131.

Bonus awards:

The following fighters were awarded bonuses:
$100,000 Performance of the Night: Lom-Ali Nalgiev
$5000 Stoppage Victory Bonuses: Elkhan Musaev, Mukhumat Vakhaev, Azamat Kerefov

Results

ACA 128: Goncharov vs. Omielańczuk

Absolute Championship Akhmat 128: Goncharov vs. Omielańczuk was a mixed martial arts event held by Absolute Championship Akhmat on September 11, 2021, at the Falcon Arena in Minsk, Belarus.

Background
The event was headlined by a featherweight bout between Evgeny Goncharov and Daniel Omielańczuk.

Bonus awards:

The following fighters were awarded bonuses:
$50,000 Performance of the Night: Vladislav Yankovsky
$5000 Stoppage Victory Bonuses: Ruslan Abiltarov, Tomáš Deák, Daniel James, Miguel Felipe Bunes da Silva, Aurel Pîrtea, Rafał Haratyk, Evgeny Goncharov

Results

ACA 129: Sarnavskiy vs. Magomedov

Absolute Championship Akhmat 129: Sarnavskiy VS. Magomedov was a mixed martial arts event held by Absolute Championship Akhmat on September 24, 2021, at the Dynamo Palace of Sports in Moscow, Russia.

Background
The event was headlined by a lightweight bout between the one-time ACA lightweight title challenger Alexander Sarnavskiy and former M-1 Global welterweight champion Rashid Magomedov.

Bonus awards:

The following fighters were awarded bonuses:
$50,000 Performance of the Night: Pavel Gordeev
$5000 Stoppage Victory Bonuses: Karshyga Dautbek, Alexey Polpudnikov, Leonardo Silva, Elismar Lima, Alihan Suleimanov

Results

ACA 130: Dudaev vs. Praia

Absolute Championship Akhmat 130: Dudaev vs. Praia was a mixed martial arts event held by Absolute Championship Akhmat on October 4, 2021, in Grozny, Russia.

Background

Bonus awards:

The following fighters were awarded bonuses:
$50,000 Performance of the Night: Altynbek Mamashov
$5000 Stoppage Victory Bonuses: Abubakar Mestoev, Murad Kalamov, Felipe Froes, Chersi Dudaev

Results

ACA YE 21: Midaev vs. Djakhbarov

Absolute Championship Akhmat Young Eagles 21: Midaev vs. Djakhbarovwas a mixed martial arts event held by Absolute Championship Akhmat on October 11, 2021, at the Tolstoy-Yurt Arena in Tolstoy-Yurt, Russia.

Background

Bonus awards:
 
The following fighters were awarded bonuses:
Fight of the Night: Dukvakha Astamirov vs. Magomed Magomedov 
Submission of the Night: Firuz Nazaraliev

Results

ACA 131: Abdulvakhabov vs. Dias

Absolute Championship Akhmat 131: Abdulvakhabov vs. Dias was be a mixed martial arts event held by Absolute Championship Akhmat on November 5, 2021, in Moscow, Russia.

Background
Two title fights were scheduled for the event: Abdul-Aziz Abdulvakhabov made the first title defense of his second lightweight title reign against Hacran Dias in the main event, while Magomedrasul Khasbulaev was scheduled to make the first defense of his featherweight title against Ramazan Kishev.

Bonus awards:

The following fighters were awarded bonuses:
$50,000 Performance of the Night: Alan Gomes
$5000 Stoppage Victory Bonuses: Mukhamed Aushev,  Mikhail Dolgov, Adam Bogatyrev, Ivan Shtyrkov, Magomedrasul Khasbulaev

Results

ACA YE 22: Satuev vs. Amanbaev

Absolute Championship Akhmat Young Eagles 22: Satuev vs. Amanbaevwas a mixed martial arts event held by Absolute Championship Akhmat on November 12, 2021, at the Tolstoy-Yurt Arena in Tolstoy-Yurt, Russia.

Background

Bonus awards:
 
The following fighters were awarded bonuses:
Knockout of the Night: Abubakar Khasiev
Submission of the Night: Amir Aliev

Results

ACA 132: Johnson vs. Vakhaev

Absolute Championship Akhmat 132: Johnson vs. Vakhaev was a mixed martial arts event held by Absolute Championship Akhmat on November 18, 2021, at the Falcon Arena in Minsk, Belarus.

Background

Bonus awards:

The following fighters were awarded bonuses:
$50,000 Performance of the Night: Beslan Isaev
$5000 Stoppage Victory Bonuses: Josiel Silva, Daniel James, Nikola Dipchikov, Denis Smoldarev, Tony Johnson Jr.

Results

ACA 133: Bimarzaev vs. Lima

Absolute Championship Akhmat 133: Bimarzaev vs. Lima was a mixed martial arts event held by Absolute Championship Akhmat on December 4, 2021, at the Sibur Arena in Saint Petersburg, Russia.

Background
A ACA Light Heavyweight Championship bout between the champion Muslim Magomedov and Grigor Matevosyan was slated to serve as the event headliner. However, has been postponed due to health reasons of the title holder.. On November 29, it is announced that Apti Bimarzaev will fought against Elismar Lima in the main event.

Bonus awards:

The following fighters were awarded bonuses:
$50,000 Performance of the Night: Valery Myasnikov
$5000 Stoppage Victory Bonuses: Kamil Oniszczuk, Goran Reljić, Akhmed Musakaev, Maycon Silvan

Results

ACA 134: Bagov vs. Koshkin

Absolute Championship Akhmat 134: Bagov vs. Koshkin was a mixed martial arts event held by Absolute Championship Akhmat on December 17, 2021, at the Basket-Hall Krasnodar in Krasnodar, Russia.

Background
A undisputed ACA Middleweight Championship bout between the champion Salamu Abdurahmanov and the interim champion Magomedrasul Gasanov was slated to serve as the event headliner. However, Abdurahmanov have to withdraw for this event due to an injury.

Bonus awards:

The following fighters were awarded bonuses:
$50,000 Performance of the Night: Islam Omarov 
$5000 Stoppage Victory Bonuses: Murat Gugov, Ibragim Magomedov, Khusein Kushagov, Alexey Polpudnikov, Vener Galiev

Results

ACA YE 25: Grand Prix Final 

Absolute Championship Akhmat Young Eagles 25: Grand Prix Finalwas a mixed martial arts event held by Absolute Championship Akhmat on December 25, 2021, at the Sport Hall Coliseum in Grozny, Russia.

Background

Bonus awards:
 
The following fighters were awarded bonuses:
Knockout of the Night: 
Submission of the Night:

Results

See also
List of current ACA fighters
 2021 in UFC
2021 in Bellator
 2021 in ONE Championship
2021 in Rizin Fighting Federation
2021 in Konfrontacja Sztuk Walki
2021 in Fight Nights Global
2021 in Legacy Fighting Alliance

References

External links
ACA

Absolute Championship Akhmat
Absolute Championship Berkut events
2021 in mixed martial arts
2021 sport-related lists
Absolute Championship